Diploptera, also known as the beetle cockroach, is a genus of blaberid cockroaches. Cockroaches of this genus resemble beetles, with hardened tegmina and cross-folded hindwings. They live in tropical forests in South China and Southeast Asia, and Pacific islands including Hawaii. They are viviparous cockroaches and are therefore used for insect endocrinological studies. There are eight known species and two subspecies.

Species
Species included:

 Diploptera elliptica Li & Wang, 2015
 Diploptera erythrocephala Princis, 1950
 Diploptera maculata Hanitsch, 1925
 Diploptera minor (Brunner von Wattenwyl, 1865)
 Diploptera naevus Li & Wang, 2015
 Diploptera nigrescens Shiraki, 1931
 Diploptera nigrescens nigrescens Shiraki, 1931
 Diploptera nigrescens guani Li & Wang, 2015
 Diploptera parva Princis, 1953
 Diploptera punctata (Eschscholtz, 1822)

References

Cockroach genera